, commonly referred to as ArcSys, is a Japanese video game developer and publisher located in Yokohama. Founded by Minoru Kidooka in 1988, the company is known for arcade 2D fighting game franchises, including Guilty Gear and BlazBlue, as well as other license-based fighting games for Dragon Ball, Persona 4 Arena (Ultimax), Granblue Fantasy Versus (Rising) and others.

History
The company was founded in January 1988 and incorporated as Arc Co., Ltd. in May. The company spent early years as a contract developer for Sega, Sammy and Banpresto. It consisted at the time of around eight developers; most of whom had previously worked at Sega including founder Minoru Kidooka. It was renamed Arc System Works in 1991. In 1992 they developed a game for the Famicom called Pizza Pop!. The company produced a series of Sailor Moon video games for publisher Angel including Bishōjo Senshi Sailor Moon S: Jōgai Rantō!? Shuyaku Sōdatsusen which was the first fighting game they produced.

They published their first title in 1995 which was Exector for the PlayStation.

On June 11, 2015, the company acquired all intellectual properties of Technōs Japan, such as Double Dragon and Kunio-Kun, from Million Co., Ltd. Even prior to its acquisition of Million's library, the company had been the publisher of Technōs' video games for Virtual Console in Japan. Following the transaction, the company took the publishing duties from Aksys Games for Virtual Console releases in North America, though some Technōs  games were already published by Arc System Works.

On February 6, 2017, the company acquired the rights to the Jake Hunter, Theresia, Nazo no Jikenbo, and Koneko no Ie series from publisher WorkJam. On November 2, 2017, the company announced the establishment of a North American branch in Torrance, California, known as Arc System Works America, Inc.

Games developed

Games published

See also

References

External links
 

Amusement companies of Japan
Companies based in Yokohama
Video game companies established in 1988
Video game companies of Japan
Video game development companies
Video game publishers
Japanese companies established in 1988